Lingulatus is a genus of araneomorph spiders in the family Phrurolithidae. It was first described by Mu & Zhang in 2022.

Species 
, it contains eleven species:

 Lingulatus brevis Mu & Zhang, 2022 — China
 Lingulatus chaijin Lin & Li, 2023 — Vietnam
 Lingulatus christae (Jäger & Wunderlich, 2012) — Laos
 Lingulatus dongping Lin & Li, 2023 — Vietnam
 Lingulatus liying Lin & Li, 2023 — Vietnam
 Lingulatus longfeiae Lin & Li, 2023 — Vietnam
 Lingulatus longulus Mu & Zhang, 2022 — China
 Lingulatus luzhishen Lin & Li, 2023 — Vietnam
 Lingulatus pingbian Mu & Zhang, 2022 (type) — China
 Lingulatus zhangqing Lin & Li, 2023 — Vietnam
 Lingulatus zhutong Lin & Li, 2023 — Vietnam

References 

Phrurolithidae genera
Spiders of Asia
Phrurolithidae